The Polymorphic Programming Language (PPL) was developed in 1969 at Harvard University by Thomas A. Standish. It is an interactive, extensible language with a base language similar to the language APL.

The assignment operator <- (or ←) has influenced the language S.

References 

Procedural programming languages
Harvard University
Programming languages created in 1969